Chiang Rai  is one of Thailand's seventy-six provinces, which lies in upper northern Thailand and is Thailand's northernmost province. It is bordered by the Shan State of Myanmar to the north, Bokeo province of Laos to the east, Phayao to the south, Lampang to the southwest, and Chiang Mai to the west. The provinces is linked to Houayxay Laos by the Fourth Thai–Lao Friendship Bridge that spans the Mekong.

Geography
The north of the province is part of the so-called Golden Triangle, where the borders of Thailand, Laos and Burma converge, an area which prior to the rise of agricultural production of coffee, pineapple, coconuts, and banana plantations, was unsafe because of drug smuggling across the borders. The Mekong River forms the boundary with Laos, the Mae Sai and Ruak River with Burma. Through the town of Chiang Rai itself, flows the "Mae Kok" Kok River and south of it the Lao River, a tributary of the Kok.

While the eastern part of the province is characterized by relatively flat river plains, the northern and western part consists of the hilly terrain of the Thai highlands with the Khun Tan Range and the Phi Pan Nam Range in the west and the Daen Lao Range in the north. Wat Phra That Doi Chom Thong wat on top of the hill, according to the chronicles, dates back to the year 911. Nearby is Doi Tung Royal Villa, former residence of the late princess mother Somdej Phra Srinagarindra (mother of King Rama IX). Thanks to her activities the hills were reforested, and the hill tribes diverted from growing opium poppies to other crops including coffee, bananas, coconuts, and pineapples.

National parks
There are seven national parks, along with one other national park, make up region 15 of Thailand's protected areas.
 Doi Luang National Park, 
 Lam Nam Kok National Park, 
 Mae Puem National Park, 
 Phu Sang National Park, 
 Khun Chae National Park, 
 Phu Chi Fa National Park, 
 Tham Luang–Khun Nam Nang Non National Park,

History

Chiang Rai was founded in 1262. Populations have dwelled in Chiang Rai since the 7th century and it became the center of the Lanna Kingdom during the 13th century. The region, rich in natural resources, was occupied by the Burmese until 1786.

Chiang Rai province's golden triangle bordering Laos and Burma was once the hub of opium production.

Chiang Rai became a province in 1910, after being part of the Lanna Kingdom for centuries. After Lanna was incorporated into Thailand, it remained an autonomous region and thus the Chiang Rai area was administered from Chiang Mai.

Chiang Rai province is a transit point for Rohingya refugees from Myanmar (Burma) who are transported there from Sangkhlaburi district in Kanchanaburi province.

Demographics
The majority of the population are ethnic Thai who speak Kham Muang among themselves, but 12.5% are of hill tribes origin, a sizeable minority in the north provinces. A smaller number are of Chinese descent, mainly descendants of the Kuomintang soldiers who settled in the region, notably in Santikhiri.

Ethnic groups 

Khon Muang are the city folk who originally came from Chiang Mai, Lamphun, Lampang, and Phrae. Culturally, they design their houses having only one floor with wooden gable decorations called "ka-lae". They are known for their craftsmanship in wood carving, weaving, lacquer ware, and musical instruments.

Tai Yai (ไทใหญ่) (Shan) are a Tai ethnic group who primarily live in what is now Shan State in Burma, and also in Mae Hong Son province in Thailand. They grow rice, farm, raise cattle, and trade. Their craftsmanship lies in weaving, pottery, wood carving, and bronze ware.

Akha have the largest population of any hill tribe in the region. Originating from Tibet and southern China, they dwell on high ground around 1,200 meters above sea level. Within their villages they build spirit gateways to protect them from evil spirits.

Lahu (Musor) are also from the Yunnanese area and live in high areas. They are known as hunters and planters.
Karen live in various areas of the region which have valleys and riverbanks.

Chin Haw in Chiang Rai consist primarily of the former Kuomintang (KMT army) who took refuge in the area, mainly in Santikhiri (formerly Mae Salong).
 
Hmong from southern China, inhabit high ground. They raise livestock and grow rice, corn, tobacco, and cabbage. They are also known for their embroidery and silver.

Tai Lue (Dai) live in dwellings of usually only a single room wooden house built on high poles. They are skilled in weaving.

Lisu from southern China and Tibet are renowned for their colorful dress and also build their dwellings on high stilts. They harvest rice and corn and their men are skilled in hunting.

Yao (Mien) reside along mountain sides and grow corn and other crops. They are skilled blacksmiths, silversmiths, and embroiders.

Symbols

The seal of the province shows a white elephant, the royal symbol, recalling that Chiang Rai was founded by King Mengrai, according to legend because his elephant liked the place.

The provincial tree is the tree jasmine (Radermachera ignea), and the provincial flower is the orange trumpet (Pyrostegia venusta).

The former provincial slogan was "เหนือสุดในสยาม อร่ามดอยตุง ผดุงวัฒนธรรม รสล้ำข้าวสาร หอมหวานลิ้นจี่ สตรีโสภา ชาเลิศรส สัปปะรดนางแล", 'Northernmost of Siam, beautiful Doi Tung, repository of culture, most delicious rice, sweet and fragrant lychee, beautiful women, the finest flavoured tea, pineapple from Nang Lae, source of the giant catfish".

The current slogan is "เหนือสุดในสยาม ชายแดนสามแผ่นดิน ถิ่นวัฒนธรรมล้านนา ล้ำค่าพระธาตุดอยตุง", 'Northernmost of Siam, frontier of three lands, the home of Lan Na culture and Doi Tung Temple'.

Hospitals
 Kasemrad Sriburin General Hospital, Private hospital.
 Chiangrai Prachanukroh Hospital, Public hospital.

Transport

Air
Chiang Rai International Airport has domestic flights to both Bangkok airports, which connect to regional and international flights.

Boat
There is daily boat service between Chiang Rai and Tha Ton.

Rail
There is no railway system in Chiang Rai. The nearest station is Chiang Mai Railway Station.

Road

Decent bus services are available in the province. In more remote areas, songthaews are the norm.

Administrative divisions

Provincial government
Chiang Rai is divided into 18 districts (amphoes). The districts are further divided into 124 subdistricts (tambons) and 1,751 villages (mubans).

Local government
As of 26 November 2019 there are: one Chiang Rai Provincial Administration Organisation and 73 municipal (thesaban) areas in the province. Chiang Rai has city (thesaban nakhon) status. Further 72 subdistrict municipalities (thesaban tambon). The non-municipal areas are administered by 70 Subdistrict Administrative Organisations - SAO (ongkan borihan suan tambon).

Human achievement index 2017

Since 2003, United Nations Development Programme (UNDP) in Thailand has tracked progress on human development at sub-national level using the Human achievement index (HAI), a composite index covering all the eight key areas of human development. National Economic and Social Development Board (NESDB) has taken over this task since 2017.

Gallery

References

External links

Provincial Website(Thai)
Chiang Rai page from the Tourist Authority of Thailand

 
Provinces of Thailand
Populated places on the Mekong River

Religion